Michael Hertwig (born 17 November 1960 in Offenburg) is a former German football player and manager.

Hertwig, formerly on the books of FC Bayern Munich, made ten appearances for Karlsruher SC during the 1984–85 Bundesliga campaign and played 25 games the following season for Tennis Borussia Berlin in the 2. Bundesliga.

References

External links 
 

1960 births
Living people
People from Offenburg
Sportspeople from Freiburg (region)
German footballers
Association football defenders
Bundesliga players
2. Bundesliga players
FC Bayern Munich footballers
Karlsruher SC players
Tennis Borussia Berlin players
German football managers
Offenburger FV players
Footballers from Baden-Württemberg